Animas River (On-e-mas) is a  river in the western United States, a tributary of the San Juan River, part of the Colorado River System.

The Animas-La Plata Water Project was completed in 2015. The project pumps water over a low pass to fill a reservoir, Lake Nighthorse, in Ridges Basin to satisfy Southern Ute tribal water rights claims associated with the Colorado Ute Settlement Act amendments of 2000.

Name

Spanish explorer Juan Maria de Rivera of Santa Fe recorded the name "Rio de las Animas" (in English, River of Souls) in 1765. One theory is that the full name of the river was once "Rio de las Animas Perdidas" (River of Lost Souls) commemorating people who died in the river. A handful of commentators (3) have suggested that the origin of this river's name is confused name with the Purgatoire River of southeastern Colorado.

Watershed

The Animas River rises high in San Juan Mountains of Colorado at the confluence of the West and North forks at the ghost town of Animas Forks and flows south past the ghost towns of Eureka and Howardsville. At Silverton, the river flows into the Animas Canyon.  The Durango and Silverton Narrow gauge railroad follows the river through the canyon to Durango. From Durango the river flows south into New Mexico through the town of Aztec to its confluence with the San Juan River at Farmington. The only major tributary of the Animas River is the Florida River which converges just north of the Colorado–New Mexico border.

A methane seep was reported on the river in Durango, Colorado in 2016.

Indigenous peoples
The ancestral Puebloan site of Aztec Ruins National Monument is situated along the river in the present day town of Aztec and for much of its course the river flows through native Ute and Navajo lands.

Engineering and development
Numerous irrigation ditches serve the surrounding farmland along the river. The Durango Pumping Plant, completed in 2011, as part of the Animas-La Plata Water Project, draws an average annual of 57,100 acre-feet from the river, for storage in Lake Nighthorse.

Wildlife and plants
The Animas serves as habitat to resident and migratory bald eagles which arrive in the winter months to take advantage of the ice-free river.

2015 contaminants spill

In August 2015, the La Plata County Sheriff's Office closed the river to the public after a crew working for the EPA released approximately 3 million gallons of mine waste into Cement Creek, a tributary of the Animas.  The plug was accidentally removed while investigating a leak at the abandoned Gold King Mine. The mine was last active in the 1920s, but it had been leaking toxic water at a rate of 50 to 250 gallons a minute for years. The spill contained the toxic metals arsenic, cadmium, and lead, as well as the metals aluminum and copper. There may be other toxic heavy metals in the plume.

The spill changed the color of the river to orange, and the spill was described as "devastating" by Kim Stevens, the director of Environment Colorado, who said that businesses who rely on the river for profit might have to close down. The river's fish population might also be at risk due to the toxic waste that now runs through the river.

In February 2016, the Associated Press reported that the spill "dumped 880,000 pounds of metals" into the Animas River, and that "most of the metals settled into the riverbed."  The metals considered are "cadmium, copper, lead, mercury, nickel, zinc, and possibly others."

Recreation

The Animas river is a major white water rafting attraction accounting for 8.9% of Colorado's commercial rafting market while annually generating 45,411 commercial user days and direct expenditures of $5,207,033 (2011 est).

The Animas is a freestone fishery well populated with rainbow, brown, Colorado River cutthroat, and brook trout. It is considered a gold medal fishery above Rivera Bridge Crossing in Colorado. Recreational fishing with artificial lures and flies on the Animas is available year-round due to moderate winter weather. Insect hatches of aquatic diptera and mayflies occur in the winter and spring months. In late spring, summer and through fall the Animas sees caddisfly and mayfly hatches as well as terrestrials such as grasshoppers. Animas trout average . Brown trout as large as  have been caught in the Animas.

See also
 List of rivers of Colorado
 List of rivers of New Mexico
 List of tributaries of the Colorado River
 Animas-La Plata Water Project
 Lake Nighthorse

References

Further reading
 Thompson, Jonathan. (2015). "When our river turned orange" [High Country News].
 Desborough, G.A. and D.B. Yager. (2000). Acid-neutralizing potential of igneous bedrocks in the Animas River headwaters, San Juan County, Colorado [U.S. Geological Survey Open-File Report 00-165]. Reston, VA: U.S. Department of the Interior, U.S. Geological Survey.
 Nash, T. (1999). Geochemical investigations and interim recommendations for priority abandoned mine sites, BLM lands, upper Animas River watershed, San Juan County, Colorado [U.S. Geological Survey Open-File Report 99-323]. Reston, VA: U.S. Department of the Interior, U.S. Geological Survey.
 Yager, D.B. et al. (2003). Ferricrete, manganocrete, and bog iron occurrences with selected sedge bogs and active iron bogs and springs in the upper Animas River watershed, San Juan County, Colorado [Miscellaneous Field Studies Map MF-2406]. Denver: U.S. Department of the Interior, U.S. Geological Survey.

External links

 River Reach Foundation
 City of Durango-Animas River

Rivers of Colorado
Rivers of New Mexico
Tributaries of the Colorado River in Colorado
Tributaries of the Colorado River in New Mexico
Rivers of San Juan County, New Mexico
Rivers of La Plata County, Colorado
Rivers of San Juan County, Colorado
Old Spanish Trail (trade route)